Power County is a county located in the U.S. state of Idaho. As of the 2010 Census, the county had a population of 7,817. The county seat and largest city is American Falls. The county was created by the Idaho Legislature on January 30, 1913, by a partition of Cassia County. It is named for an early hydroelectric power plant (1902) at the American Falls.

Geography

Adjacent counties
 Bannock County – east
 Oneida County – south
 Bingham County – north
 Blaine County – northwest
 Cassia County – southwest

Major highways
 Interstate 86
 US 30
 SH-37
 SH-39

National protected areas
 Caribou National Forest (part)
 Craters of the Moon National Monument and Preserve (part)
 Curlew National Grassland (part)
 Minidoka National Wildlife Refuge (part)
 Sawtooth National Forest (part)

Government
Power County's commissioners are:
Ronald Funk (Chairman, District 1)
William Lasley (District 2)
Delane Anderson (District 3)

Demographics

2000 census
As of the census of 2000, there were 7,538 people, 2,560 households, and 1,968 families living in the county. The population density was 5 people per square mile (2/km2). There were 2,844 housing units at an average density of 2 per square mile (1/km2). The racial makeup of the county was 83.78% White, 0.09% Black or African American, 3.29% Native American, 0.32% Asian, 0.04% Pacific Islander, 11.10% from other races, and 1.38% from two or more races. 21.73% of the population were Hispanic or Latino of any race. 18.0% were of German, 17.6% English and 10.9% American ancestry.

There were 2,560 households, out of which 40.90% had children under the age of 18 living with them, 63.40% were married couples living together, 8.80% had a female householder with no husband present, and 23.10% were non-families. 20.30% of all households were made up of individuals, and 8.80% had someone living alone who was 65 years of age or older. The average household size was 2.92 and the average family size was 3.38.

In the county, the population was spread out, with 33.80% under the age of 18, 8.40% from 18 to 24, 25.40% from 25 to 44, 22.00% from 45 to 64, and 10.40% who were 65 years of age or older. The median age was 32 years. For every 100 females, there were 101.00 males. For every 100 females age 18 and over, there were 99.90 males.

The median income for a household in the county was $32,226, and the median income for a family was $36,685. Males had a median income of $29,676 versus $20,930 for females. The per capita income for the county was $14,007. About 10.80% of families and 16.10% of the population were below the poverty line, including 20.10% of those under age 18 and 12.70% of those age 65 or over.

2010 census
As of the 2010 United States Census, there were 7,817 people, 2,641 households, and 2,019 families living in the county. The racial makeup of the county was 75.1% white, 2.3% American Indian, 0.4% Asian, 0.3% black or African American, 0.1% Pacific islander, 19.5% from other races, and 2.4% from two or more races. Those of Hispanic or Latino origin made up 29.8% of the population. In terms of ancestry, 16.7% were German, 16.7% were English, and 7.2% were American.

Of the 2,641 households, 40.7% had children under the age of 18 living with them, 60.6% were married couples living together, 10.1% had a female householder with no husband present, 23.6% were non-families, and 19.8% of all households were made up of individuals. The average household size was 2.94 and the average family size was 3.39. The median age was 33.2 years.

The median income for a household in the county was $40,843 and the median income for a family was $46,391. Males had a median income of $35,674 versus $29,844 for females. The per capita income for the county was $18,412. About 8.3% of families and 11.1% of the population were below the poverty line, including 13.7% of those under age 18 and 12.3% of those age 65 or over.

Communities

Cities
American Falls
Pocatello (partly)
Rockland

Census-designated place
Arbon Valley

Unincorporated communities
Arbon
Neeley
Pauline
Roy

See also
National Register of Historic Places listings in Power County, Idaho

References

External links
County website
County Parcel Map
 

 
Idaho counties
1913 establishments in Idaho
Populated places established in 1913
Pocatello, Idaho metropolitan area